Walter John Downes (born 9 June 1961) is an English professional football manager and former player who played as a midfielder. He was most recently manager of AFC Wimbledon.

As a footballer, Downes played the majority of his career for Wimbledon as well as shorter spells with Newport County, Sheffield United and Hayes. He was the manager of Brentford between 2002 and 2004.

Early and personal life
Downes was born in Hammersmith, London. He is the nephew of former world middleweight boxing champion Terry Downes.

Playing career
Downes started out as an apprentice with Wimbledon and was their first ever full-time Football League apprentice. He is often cited as being the main instigator of the Crazy Gang spirit at the club, as it rose from the Fourth to the First Division inside a decade. In 1979, aged 17 he scored on his league debut against Barnsley and went on to make over 200 appearances for Wimbledon, usually as a midfielder.

In 1988, he left to join his mentor and former Wimbledon manager Dave Bassett at Sheffield United, but his career for his new club was severely limited by a number of serious injuries, and also by a poor disciplinary record, getting sent off twice in his nine appearances.

Coaching career

Crystal Palace
Following four broken legs he retired through injury. Downes took a coaching position at Crystal Palace, and spent 12 years at Selhurst Park, most of these under Steve Coppell.

Reading
Downes then once again rejoined Coppell, this time at Reading, initially on a casual basis, but quickly proved himself invaluable, and took on the job of coaching Reading's defence. As a result, Downes was a major reason for Reading's impressive defensive display in the 2005–06 Championship season, where Reading had the best defensive statistics in the entire English football pyramid, and were promoted to the Premier League with a record 106 points.

In January 2007, Downes was involved in a touchline scuffle with Sheffield United manager Neil Warnock after he accused Warnock of telling his players to 'break legs'. However Warnock said: "I made the kicking gesture to tell the referee that Steve Sidwell's tackle on Chris Armstrong had been the worst of the game. Fortunately for me, the referee heard exactly what was said and confirmed that." Downes was charged with improper conduct for his role in the affray.

On 14 May 2009, the club announced that they wouldn't renew his and Kevin Dillon's contract after Reading failed to bounce back to the Premier League at the first attempt after getting knocked out of the play-offs by Burnley 3–0 on aggregate and the departure of Steve Coppell. This was officially announced on the day of Steve Coppell's press conference.

Southampton
On 7 September 2009, Downes was appointed to a position within the backroom staff of League 1 club, Southampton. He was dismissed along with Alan Pardew on 30 August 2010.

West Ham United
For a few weeks in October and November 2010 Downes was hired as a part-time defensive coach for League Two side Gillingham. Then on 24 November 2010, Downes was appointed as a defensive coach at West Ham United under manager Avram Grant. His appointment came a day after the West Ham board sacked assistant manager Zeljko Petrovic. In May 2011, shortly after West Ham were relegated from the Premier League, Grant was sacked however Downes kept his job and was named first team coach when new manager Sam Allardyce took over. On 11 December 2012 Downes' departure from his role with West Ham United was announced.  He went on to spend some time working under Harry Redknapp at Queens Park Rangers.

India
Prior to the 2017–18 Indian Super League season, Downes joined Steve Coppell at Jamshedpur. He subsequently coached at other Indian clubs, Kerala Blasters and ATK.

Managerial career

Brentford
Downes left Crystal Palace in 2000 and joined Brentford as assistant manager. After Ron Noades stepped down as manager, he carried on in the role under Ray Lewington and Steve Coppell. When Coppell left Brentford in June 2002, Downes was appointed manager. He had an unbeaten start to his reign in August 2002, winning the Division Two Manager of the Month award. Downes led the club to 16th position in the Second Division in 2002–03, but was sacked in March 2004 after a run of poor results and the club near the bottom of the table and facing relegation.

AFC Wimbledon
On 4 December 2018, Downes took over after Neal Ardley had left the club by mutual consent. His assistant manager was fellow former Wimbledon FC midfielder Glyn Hodges. When Downes was appointed, Wimbledon were six points from avoiding relegation from League One. They had slipped further behind to be nine points below 20th place in early March. Under Downes they won 21 points from their last 12 matches and successfully avoided relegation on the final day of the season. 

On 25 September 2019 he was suspended from his duties by the club after being charged by the FA for misconduct under FA Rule E1(b), in respect of eight small bets placed on various football matches in a period between 30 November 2013 and 12 July 2019. In October, the FA issued Downes with a fine of £3,000 and banned him from football for four weeks after he admitted the offences. Two days later, he and the club parted company.

Managerial statistics

Honours

As a manager
Individual
Football League Second Division Manager of the Month: August 2002

References

External links

Wally Downes at the League Managers Association website

1961 births
Living people
Footballers from Hammersmith
Association football midfielders
English footballers
Wimbledon F.C. players
Newport County A.F.C. players
Sheffield United F.C. players
Hayes F.C. players
English Football League players
English football managers
Brentford F.C. managers
AFC Wimbledon managers
English Football League managers
Crystal Palace F.C. non-playing staff
Lincoln City F.C. non-playing staff
Reading F.C. non-playing staff
Southampton F.C. non-playing staff
West Ham United F.C. non-playing staff
Sheffield United F.C. non-playing staff
Kerala Blasters FC non-playing staff
ATK (football club) non-playing staff
English expatriate sportspeople in India
Sportspeople involved in betting scandals
Association football coaches